World Vegetarian Day is observed annually around the planet on October 1. It is a day of celebration established by the North American Vegetarian Society in 1977 and endorsed by the International Vegetarian Union in 1978, "To promote the joy, compassion and life-enhancing possibilities of vegetarianism." It brings awareness to the ethical, environmental, health, and humanitarian benefits of a vegetarian lifestyle. World Vegetarian Day initiates the month of October as Vegetarian Awareness Month, which ends with November 1, World Vegan Day, as the end of that month of celebration. Vegetarian Awareness Month has been known variously as "Reverence for Life" month, "Month of Vegetarian Food", and more.

Additional days 
Several additional days of vegetarian significance are included in or on the edge of Vegetarian Awareness Month:
 Month of September - National Fruits & Veggies Month
 September 24 or 27 – "Hug a Vegan/Vegetarian Day"
 September 29 – World Heart Day
 October 1 – World Vegetarian Day
 October 2 – World Farm Animals Day (WFAD) or World Day for Farm(ed) Animals, birthday of Mohandas K. Gandhi
 October 4 – The Feast Day of St. Francis of Assisi and World Animal Day
 October 4 – Hug a Non-Meat Eater Day
 October 1–7 – International Vegetarian Week (IVW) - in several nations across the planet (but especially in Europe), many public educational and celebratory events are organized to promote the vegetarian lifestyle.
 First full week and additional 'straggler' days (in order to include as many weekends as possible for church, mosque, and temple involvement) – World Week of Prayer for Animals
 and World Animal Day (always includes The Feast Day of St. Francis of Assisi). This may have been initiated by the now-defunct INRA (International Network for Religion and Animals),  founded in 1985 by Virginia Bouraquardez (also known as Ginnie Bee), and later led by UCC minister, Rev. Marc Wessels. 
 November 1 – International Vegan Day, also known as World Vegan Day – a vegan holiday celebrated since 1994 to commemorate the creation of The Vegan Society
 Month of November - Vegan Awareness Month or World Vegan Month.

Additional Global Vegetarian Days 
 March 20 – Great American Meatout – developed and sponsored every year by FARM, also known as Farm Animal Rights Movement.
 World Meat Free Day (June 13, 2016) is sponsored by a gathering of like-minded organisations - Eating Better Alliance, Compassion in World Farming, Friends of the Earth, and a few more - who want to spread the messaging regarding the impact meat consumption can have on sustainability and health.
 The last Friday of September- International 'Hug a Vegetarian' Day  Some may have tried to 'regularize' that floating date for "Hug a Vegan/Vegetarian Day" as either September 24 or 27 rather than the last Friday of September, as set by PETA2 in 2014 or before
 November 25 – International Vegetarian Day also known as SAK Meatless Day – the birthday of Sadhu T. L. Vaswani (largely celebrated in India and throughout the Asian Pacific Rim nations, but known in Western nations among many vegetarians of Indian and Southeast Asian descent).

International Vegetarian Days 
 Meatless Monday – Every Week, go totally meatless on Monday – an international campaign that encourages people to cut out (not eat) meat on Mondays to improve their health and the health of the planet. Reducing meat consumption by 15% (the equivalent of one day a week) lessens the risk of chronic preventable illness and has a strong positive impact on the environment (strongly reduces ecological damages from the activities involved with meat production and transport or distribution). Meatless Monday offers weekly meat-free recipes, articles, tips and news. Meatless Monday is a non-profit initiative of The Monday Campaigns Inc. in association with the Johns Hopkins Bloomberg School of Public Health. The program follows the nutrition guidelines developed by the USDA.
Meatless Monday is part of the Healthy Monday initiative. Healthy Monday encourages Americans to make healthier decisions at the start of every week. Other Healthy Monday campaigns include: Do The Monday 2000, Quit and Stay Quit Monday, Move it Monday, Monday Mile and others.

Graphics 
Various graphic and artistic representations are used; there is no one logo to represent World Vegetarian Day. Some of the other dates within Vegetarian Awareness Month have their own logos, or a series of logo representations, if they are sponsored in part or totally by identifiable organizations.

Chinese society vegetarian days 

There is a common practice for some Chinese people to be vegetarian twice a lunar month - the first day and the 15th day of each lunar month. (初一)﹑(十五). The 15th day of each lunar month is the day/night with full moon. Local vegetarian restaurants are particularly busy on those 2 days. The origin of such practice is related to religious beliefs.

See also
International Vegetarian Week
List of food days
List of vegetarian festivals
List of vegetarian organizations
Meat-free days
Vegan school meal
Veganuary
World Vegan Day

References

External links
Official Website

October observances
Vegetarian organizations
International observances
Observances about food and drink
Vegetarianism in North America